Vasko Vassilev (born October 14, 1970, in Sofia, Bulgaria) is a Bulgarian violinist and conductor. At the age of eight he had his first public appearance and released his first record with the Sofia Philharmonic Orchestra. At age 10 he began his studies on a Bulgarian government grant at the Moscow Central Music School, a junior department of the Moscow Conservatory. In 1987 he took a second prize at the Marguerite Long–Jacques Thibaud Competition. In 1989 he won a second prize (the first wasn't awarded that year) at the Paganini competition. In 1994 at the age of 23 he became the youngest ever Concertmaster of the Royal Opera House in London. In 2005 he made his conducting debut at the Royal Albert Hall in London. He gives Masterclasses for violinists at the Royal College of Music, Trinity College of Music, and at the Conservatory of Music in Spain. In 2010 he wrote an autobiography Vasko @ 40. In 2011 he became a judge at the reality show X Factor (Bulgaria).

He worked with artists Plácido Domingo, Sting, The Rolling Stones, Vanessa-Mae, Lili Ivanova and others.

References 

1970 births
Living people
Bulgarian violinists
Musicians from Sofia
Bulgarian expatriates in England
X Factor (Bulgarian TV series)
21st-century violinists